The 1974 Chattanooga Moccasins football team was an American football team that represented the University of Tennessee at Chattanooga during the 1974 NCAA Division II football season. In their second year under head coach Joe Morrison, the team compiled a 4–7 record.

Schedule

References

Chattanooga
Chattanooga Mocs football seasons
Chattanooga Moccasins football